Fahrettin Altay is a light-rail station on the Konak Tram of the Tram İzmir system in İzmir, Turkey. Located along Şehit Babası Ali Resmi Tufan Avenue, near Fahrettin Altay Square, it is the current western terminus of the line. Connection to the İzmir Metro is available at Fahrettin Altay station. 

Fahrettin Altay station opened on 24 March 2018.

Connections
ESHOT operates city bus service on İnönü Avenue, Mithatpaşa Avenue and Mehmetçik Avenue.

References

Railway stations opened in 2018
2018 establishments in Turkey
Konak District
Tram transport in İzmir